"Till I Die" is a song by American singer Chris Brown featuring American rappers Big Sean and Wiz Khalifa. It was written by the artists alongside Marcella Araica and producer Danja. "Till I Die" was released digitally on April 13, 2012, as the third single from Brown's fifth studio album, Fortune (2012). It was sent to rhythmic contemporary radio in the United States on May 1, 2012. "Till I Die" is an uptempo hip hop song that displays elements of electro music and features military drumbeats, R&B synths and "arcade-game blips". The song contains lyrics about women, smoking weed, partying in the club and living the good life.

"Till I Die" garnered positive reviews from music critics, who praised the production and the trio's verses. Although it was released worldwide, the song only charted in the United States. It peaked at number twelve on the Hot R&B/Hip-Hop Songs chart, and number fifteen on the Rap Songs chart. The accompanying music video for "Till I Die" was directed by Brown and features cameo appearances by Snoop Dogg, Andy Milonakis, Kreayshawn, Jamie Kennedy, Method Man and Redman. The video was dedicated to Beastie Boys' member Adam Yauch, who died from cancer in May 2012. Brown included "Till I Die" in his set list at Supafest Australia.

Background and composition 
"Till I Die" was written by Cameron Jabril Thomaz, Chris Brown, Marcella Araica, Nathaniel "Danja" Hills and Sean Anderson, while production was handled by Danja. The audio mixing was completed by Jaycen Joshua, with assistance by Trehy Harris. On March 28, 2012, Brown announced via his official Twitter account that he would be releasing "Till I Die" and "Sweet Love" as the next two singles from Fortune, after the lead single "Turn Up the Music". The audio of "Till I Die" and its artwork were posted online on April 10, 2012, showing Brown wearing a navy blue suit and sunglasses, and standing beside a motorcycle in front of a neon-glowing backdrop. It was released as a one-track digital download in Oceania and most European countries on April 13, 2012. However, in the United States, "Till I Die" was released digitally on April 17, 2012, and sent to rhythmic contemporary radio on May 1, 2012.

"Till I Die" is an uptempo hip hop and R&B song, which last for a duration of three minutes and 57 seconds. The song blends military drumbeats and R&B synths with elements of electro music. Trent Fitzgerald of PopCrush noted that it also uses "arcade-game blips". According to Lewis Corner of Digital Spy, "Till I Die" opens with a "dubstep intro". Throughout the song, Brown, Big Sean and Wiz Khalifa rap about "smoking and intoxication", "women and weed", "partying and balling in the club", and living the good life. During the first verse, Brown references American politician Sarah Palin in the line "Sippin and I'm faded / Super medicated / Said she wanna check the poll / I said ok Sarah Palin". Rob Markman of MTV News noted that Brown harmonizes the line "I'm high" in the background.

Music video

Background

The accompanying music video for "Till I Die" was directed by Brown and filmed in Los Angeles, California on May 10, 2012. Later that day, several images from the shoot were posted online, showing Brown, Big Sean and Wiz Khalifa sitting on top of a yellow car, as well as images of the latter two posing shirtless. The video premiered online on May 30, 2012. Following its release, Brown tweeted that the video is dedicated to Beastie Boys' member Adam Yauch, who died from cancer in early May 2012. The video features cameo appearances by Andy Milonakis, Kreayshawn, Jamie Kennedy, Snoop Dogg, Method Man and Redman.

Synopsis
The video begins in an office with the mail guy (played by Kennedy), handing out mail to co-workers, while Brown's song "Beautiful People" plays in the background. As the audio of "Till I Die" begins, Brown, wearing a grey suit, beanie, gold fronts and gold chains, appears out of nowhere tripping the mail guy, and starts rapping his verse. He then appears in an elevator where he meets Wiz Khalifa and Big Sean, who then raps his verse. As they leave work, the trio catch a ride with Snoop Dogg in his yellow Pontiac Parisienne, as Sean continues rapping his verse. This scene is intercut with scenes of them hanging out in an abandoned warehouse surrounded by smoke and flashing lights. Khalifa then raps his verse as they arrive at a mansion where Method Man and Redman are seen smoking. The video ends with more scenes of the trio back at the abandoned warehouse and shows the memory to Adam Yauch.

Reception
Bene Viera of VH1 praised Brown "for creating a video that fits perfectly with the song". Viera continued writing that the song "wouldn't be [a] proper smoker's anthem" without the cameo appearance by Snoop Dogg. Rob Markman of MTV News noted that the video was different from Brown's previous music videos for the Fortune album, writing that Till I Die' is a fun and welcomed departure from it all". A reviewer for Rap-Up described the video as "wild" and "colorful", and noted that it seems to be inspired by the Beastie Boys' classic "(You Gotta) Fight for Your Right (To Party!)" (1987). Ray Rahman of Entertainment Weekly called the video "a weird one". Becky Bain of Idolator described it as "the brats-on-parade clip", and wrote that the dedication to Yauch "would be a nice sentiment if anything in this video resembled anything Yauch stood for". Maura Johnston of The Village Voice called it a "dumb" video and wrote that it reminded her of the "Our Lips Are Sealed" video by The Go-Go's.

Live performances 
Brown performed "Till I Die" for the first time with Big Sean at Supafest Australia in April 2012, as part of a set list which included "Run It!", "Yeah 3x", "Look at Me Now", "She Ain't You", "Wet the Bed" and "Turn Up the Music", among others. Rap-Up praised his set, writing that "A tatted Chris Brown thrilled with his chart-topping hits". The staff of Dolly magazine called it "one of his most electrifying performances" to date.

Critical response 
"Till I Die" garnered positive reviews from music critics. Becky Bain of Idolator appreciated the "nice blend of electro and R&B" music in the song, writing that it "has a unique sound that's both experimental and easy to lay back to". Andrew Martin of Complex magazine described "Till I Die" as a "laid-back, summer-primed production", while Becca Longmire of Entertainment Wise viewed it as a potential hit. Trent Fitzgerald of PopCrush complimented the song for having a "nice R&B groove" and added that "it will certainly get some spins on urban radio". Bene Viera of VH1 praised Brown's verse, writing that "he's seriously going to make some rappers step up their game". Hazel Robinson of California Literary Review magazine called it one of the many "excellent collaborations" on Fortune.

Maura Johnston of The Village Voice wrote that the song "sounds like a reverse-engineered version" of American pop duo Karmin's cover of "Look at Me Now" (2011), and further explained that it contains "lyrics to prove that he's still a badass". Melinda Newman of HitFix described "Till I Die" as "pot hazy". In a review of Fortune, Barry Walters of Spin magazine wrote that "Till I Die", along with "Sweet Love" and "Don't Wake Me Up", contain "thin melodies and stock shock lyrics" that make Brown's previous singles sound better. He described the song as "proudly stoned". Melissa Ruggieri of The Atlanta Journal-Constitution noted that "Big Sean and Wiz Khalifa trade the most profane verses" in the song.

Chart performance 
In the United States, "Till I Die" debuted at number 74 on the Hot R&B/Hip-Hop Songs chart in the issue dated April 28, 2012. It peaked at number twelve in the issue dated August 11, 2012. On the Rap Songs chart, the song debuted at number 25 in the issue dated June 23, 2012, and peaked at number fifteen in the issue dated August 11, 2012. "Till I Die" peaked at number one on the Bubbling Under Hot 100 Singles chart, which represents the 25 songs which failed to chart on the Billboard Hot 100.

Track listing 
Digital download
"Till I Die" (featuring Big Sean and Wiz Khalifa) – 3:57

Credits and personnel 
Credits adapted from the liner notes for Fortune

Marcella Araica – songwriter
Chris Brown – lead vocals, songwriter
Iain Findley – assistant recorder
Trehy Harris – assistant mixer

Nathaniel "Danja" Hills – songwriter, producer
Jaycen Joshua – mixer
Wiz Khalifa – guest vocals, songwriter
Big Sean – guest vocals, songwriter
Brian Springer – recorder

Charts

Weekly charts

Year-end charts

Release history

References 

2012 singles
Chris Brown songs
Big Sean songs
Wiz Khalifa songs
American hip hop songs
Song recordings produced by Danja (record producer)
Songs written by Big Sean
Songs written by Wiz Khalifa
Songs written by Chris Brown
Songs written by Marcella Araica
Songs written by Danja (record producer)
2012 songs
RCA Records singles